Stanislav Radev (born 21 September 1987) is a Bulgarian footballer currently playing for OFC Sliven 2000. He comes directly from Sliven's Youth Academy. Radev is a central defender.

2005
On 2005 the Youth Academy defender Stanislav Radev agreed the conditions of his first professional contract with the club which will be effective for five years.

References

Bulgarian footballers
1987 births
Living people
First Professional Football League (Bulgaria) players
OFC Sliven 2000 players
Association football defenders
Sportspeople from Sliven